Seán Loftus (born 1997) is an Irish hurler who plays for Galway Senior Championship club Turloughmore and at inter-county level with the Galway senior hurling team. He is usually deployed as a corner-back, but can also be deployed at midfield.

Playing career

Presentation College Athenry

Loftus attended the Presentation College in Athenry with whom he played hurling at all grades. On 2 March 2014, he was at left wing-back when the college defeated St. Brigid's College from Loughrea by 1-16 to 0-16 to win the Connacht Championship. On 9 March 2015, he scored a point from left wing-back when Presentation College defeated St. Brigid's College by 0-15 to 0-06 to win a second successive Connacht Championship. On 20 February 2016, Loftus scored 1-02 from play when Presentation College secured their third successive Connacht Championship after a 2-17 to 1-16 defeat of Fort Community School.

Turloughmore

Loftus joined the Turloughmore club at a young age and played in all grades at juvenile and underage levels. On 9 November 2013, he lined out as goalkeeper when Turloughmore defeated Liam Mellows in a replay by 1-18 to 1-10 to win the Galway Minor Championship. Loftus switched to an outfield position when Turloughmore retained the championship title in 2014.

Galway

Minor and under-21

Loftus made his first appearance for the Galway minor team on 17 August 2014 when he came on as a 27th-minute substitute in a 1-27 to 2-09 All-Ireland semi-final defeat by Limerick. He was eligible for the minor grade again the following year and was appointed captain of the team. On 6 September 2015, Loftus scored a point from left corner-forward when Galway defeated Tipperary by 4-13 to 1-16 in the All-Ireland final.

In 2016, Loftus progressed straight onto the Galway under-21 team. On 10 September 2016, he was at left wing-back when Galway suffered a 5-15 to 0-14 defeat by Waterford in the All-Ireland final.

On 4 July 2018, Loftus was at midfield when Galway defeated Wexford by 4-21 to 2-26 to win their first ever Leinster Championship title.

Senior

Loftus made his first appearance for the Galway senior hurling team on 5 March 2017 in a 3-31 to 1-11 defeat of Laois in the National Hurling League. On 23 April, he came on as a 70th-minute substitute for Paul Killeen when Galway defeated Tipperary by 3-21 to 0-14 in the 2017 National League final. Loftus made his first championship appearance on 18 June, coming on as a substitute for Adrian Tuohey, in Galway's 0-33 to 0-11 Leinster semi-final defeat of Offaly. He later won his first Leinster Championship medal, as a non-playing substitute, when Galway defeated Wexford by 0-29 to 1-17 in the subsequent final. On 3 September 2017, Loftus was an unused substitute when Galway won their first All-Ireland Championship title in 29 years after a 0-26 to 2-17 defeat of Waterford in the final.

On 8 July 2018, Loftus came on as a 69th-minute substitute for David Burke to win his second Leinster Championship medal after a 1-28 to 3-15 defeat of Kilkenny in the final. In the subsequent All-Ireland final against Limerick on 19 August, Loftus started the game on the bench but was introduced after 60 minutes as a replacement for Johnny Coen. Galway were beaten by 3-16 to 2-18.

Honours

Presentation College, Athenry
Connacht PPS Senior A Hurling Championship (3): 2014, 2015, 2016

Turloughmore
Galway Minor Hurling Championship (2): 2013, 2014

Galway
All-Ireland Senior Hurling Championship (1): 2017
Leinster Senior Hurling Championship (2): 2017, 2018
National Hurling League (2): 2017, 2021
Leinster Under-21 Hurling Championship (1): 2018
All-Ireland Minor Hurling Championship (1): 2015

Career statistics

References

1997 births
Living people
Turloughmore hurlers
University of Galway hurlers
Galway inter-county hurlers
Alumni of the University of Galway
All-Ireland Senior Hurling Championship winners